Frank McPartlin (February 16, 1872 – November 13, 1943) was a professional baseball player. He played for the New York Giants of the National League in one game on August 22, 1899. He pitched four innings, allowing four runs, two of which were earned. His minor league career stretched from 1894 to 1910.

References

1872 births
1943 deaths
Major League Baseball pitchers
Baseball players from New York (state)
New York Giants (NL) players
19th-century baseball players
Pittsfield Colts players
Amsterdam Carpet Tacks players
Syracuse Stars (minor league baseball) players
Norfolk Clams players
Norfolk Crows players
Rochester Browns players
Schenectady Dorpians players
Springfield Ponies players
Toronto Canadians players
Albany Senators players
Buffalo Bisons (minor league) players
Newark Colts players
Derby Lushers players
Rochester Bronchos players
Los Angeles Angels (minor league) players
Columbus Senators players
Indianapolis Indians players
Providence Grays (minor league) players
Little Rock Travelers players
Amsterdam-Gloversville-Johnstown Jags players
Troy Trojans (minor league) players
Haverhill Hustlers players
Waterbury Authors players
Waterbury Finnegans players
People from Hoosick Falls, New York